Larry Dixon may refer to:

 Larry Dixon (fantasy artist) (born 1966), fantasy artist and novelist
 Larry Dixon (dragster driver) (born 1966), professional drag racer in the NHRA
 Larry Dixon (politician) (1942–2020), American politician; Republican member of the Alabama Senate
 Lawrence Dixon (musician) (1894–1970), American jazz musician

See also
 Larry Dickson (born 1938), former racing driver
 Lawrence Dixon, character in Silencing Mary
 Lawrence Murray Dixon (1901–1949), architect in Miami Beach, Florida